Kamares Aqueduct, also known as the Bekir Pasha Aqueduct, is an aqueduct near Larnaca, Cyprus. Located outside the city, near the old road to Limassol, it was built starting in 1747. Tassos Mikropoulos has described it as the most prominent water supply built in Cyprus.

History
The aqueduct was financed by Ebubekir Pasha (also known as Koca Bekir Pasha or Abu Bakr Pasha) who was the Ottoman Governor of Larnaca. The structure was in operation until 1939 and consists of 75 arches.

The construction of the aqueduct commenced in 1747 and was completed in 1750, costing a total of 50,000 qirsh which was paid by Ebubekir Pasha. Foreign travellers have often counted it as one of the most important monument constructed during the Ottoman period in Cyprus. In 1754, Alexander Drummond noted that:

References

Bibliography

 .
 .
 .
 .
 .
 .

Ottoman architecture in Cyprus
Infrastructure completed in 1747
Aqueducts in Cyprus